Maximilian Neuberger (born 23 April 2000) is a German professional footballer who plays as a defender for  club FC Ingolstadt.

References

External links

2000 births
Living people
People from Illertissen
German footballers
Association football defenders
2. Bundesliga players
3. Liga players
Oberliga (football) players
FV Illertissen players
FC Ingolstadt 04 players
FC Ingolstadt 04 II players